Jane Street Capital, typically referred to as Jane Street, is a global proprietary trading firm. Today, Jane Street Capital employs more than 2,000 people in five offices around the world, located in New York, London, Hong Kong, Amsterdam, Singapore. The firm trades a broad range of asset classes on more than 200 venues in 45 countries. The company is one of the world’s largest market-makers, trading more than $17 trillion worth of securities in 2020. It was considered to have helped keep bond exchange-traded funds (ETFs) liquid during the market turmoil in 2020. Both Sam Bankman-Fried and Caroline Ellison were once employed by the company.

History
Jane Street was co-founded by Tim Reynolds, Rob Granieri, Marc Gerstein, and Michael Jenkins. Among its founders, Reynolds, Granieri, and Jenkins were formerly traders at Susquehanna International Group.

Jane Street's website says the firm was founded in 2000. However, Reynolds reports it to have been founded in 1999, and the date varies between sources. According to Delaware state records, Jane Street Capital, LLC was incorporated in August of 1999.

In 2012, Tim Reynolds stepped down from his position running the firm to focus on philanthropy.

By 2018, Jane Street reportedly traded an average of $13 billion in global equities every day and handled 7 percent of ETF volume worldwide.

The firm ended 2020 having traded $4 trillion in global equities, $1.4 trillion in bonds, and $3.9 trillion in ETFs. During the COVID-19 pandemic, the firm saw its revenue jump 54% to a record of $10.6 billion during the year ended in March 2021.

Technology 

Jane Street, uses the OCaml programming language. It adopted OCaml as its main programming language early on because the language's functional programming style and clear expressiveness made it possible for code reviews to be performed by traders who were not programmers, to verify that high-performance code would do what it was intended to do. Jane Street has stated that "OCaml helps us to quickly adapt to changing market conditions, and go from prototypes to production systems with less effort". Furthermore, OCaml's "rigor is like catnip to some people,... giving Jane Street an unusual advantage in the tight hiring market for programmers" that allows Jane Street to "lure a steady supply of high-quality candidates". Jane Street also takes advantage of programmable hardware like FPGAs to implement some of the logic.

Jane Street has released some open source code on GitHub that includes their versions of standard OCaml libraries.

In July 2020, S&P Global Ratings affirmed Jane Street on capital growth. The rating agency noted that Jane Street is a "highly profitable trading business," that "the company has generated very strong earnings so far in 2020 and that its trading has benefited from the market volatility related to the COVID-19 pandemic."

References

External links
 
 BusinessWeek profile

Financial services companies established in 2000
Financial derivative trading companies
Financial services companies of Hong Kong
Financial services companies based in New York City